Sergeants Hill is a lightly populated locality in the West Coast region of New Zealand's South Island. It is situated in a rural setting on the eastern outskirts of Westport in the Buller District.

State Highway 67 and a branch line of the Stillwater - Westport railway both pass through Sergeants Hill. The railway is part of the first line built in the Buller District; it opened on 31 December 1875 and linked Westport with Fairdown. The line subsequently grew into the Seddonville Branch and was opened through to the Seddonville terminus on 23 February 1895. Passenger services through Sergeants Hill, which were always mixed trains, were cancelled from 14 October 1946, and on 3 May 1981, the line was closed beyond Ngakawau. Its sole traffic is now coal exported via the port of Lyttelton.

References 

Buller District
Populated places in the West Coast, New Zealand